Khafji Airport is a small airfield located southern the city of Khafji in the Eastern Province of Saudi Arabia. It occupies a small land area of approximately 0.45 km2 adjacent to the shore. The airstrip is owned by the national Saudi oil company Saudi Aramco, and used to be operated for local general aviation for company logistics. However, lately it seems to be not in use, making employees traveling from and to Khafji to use the Kuwait International Airport about 100 km north of the city in the nearby country of Kuwait. The ICAO designator of this field is OE45.

Facilities
Helipads are available at the airfield. A small but covered parking lot is available at the entrance of the airfield.

References 

Airports in Saudi Arabia